Induced-charge electrokinetics in physics is the electrically driven fluid flow and particle motion in a liquid electrolyte. Consider a metal particle (which is neutrally charged but electrically conducting) in contact with an aqueous solution in a chamber/channel. If different voltages apply to the end of this chamber/channel, electric field will generate in this chamber/channel. This applied electric field passes through this metal particle and causes the free charges inside the particle migrate under the skin of particle. As a result of this migration, the negative charges moves to the side which is close to the positive (or higher) voltage while the positive charges moves to the opposite side of the particle. These charges under the skin of conducting particle attract the counter-ions of the aqueous solution; thus, the electric double layer (EDL) forms around the particle. The EDL sign on the surface of the conducting particle changes from positive to negative and the distribution of the charges varies along the particle geometry. Due to these variations, the EDL is non-uniform and has different signs. Thus, the induced zeta potential around the particle, and consequently slip velocity on the surface of the particle, vary as a function of local electric field. Differences in magnitude and direction of slip velocity on the surface of the conducting particle effects the flow pattern around this particle and causes micro vortices. Yasaman Daghighi and Dongqing Li, for the first time, experimentally illustrated these induced vortices around a 1.2mm diameter carbon-steel sphere under the 40V/cm direct current (DC) external electric filed.
Chenhui Peng et al. also experimentally showed the patterns of electro-osmotic flow around an Au sphere when alternating current (AC) is involved (E=10mV/μm, f=1 kHz).
Electrokinetics here refers to a branch of science related to the motion and reaction of charged particles to the applied electric filed and its effects on its environment. It is sometimes referred as non-linear electrokinetic phenomena as well.

History 
Levich is one of the pioneers in induced-charge electrokinetic field.   He calculated the perturbed slip profile around a conducting particle in contact with electrolyte. He also theoretically predicted that vortices induced around this particle once the electric filed is applied.

Induced vortices around a conducting particle 
The size and strength of the induced vortices around a conducting particle have direct relationship with the applied electric filed and also the size of the conducted surface. This phenomenon is experimentally and numerically proven by several studies, The vortices grow as the external electric field increases and generate "sinkhole"  at the center of the each vortex while circulates the fluid faster. It is demonstrated that increasing the size of the conducting surface forms bigger induced vortices to the point that geometry does not limits this grows.

Applications 
The induced vortices have many applications in various aspects of electrokinetic microfluidics. There are many micro-mixers that are designed and fabricated based on the existence of their induced vortices in the microfluidics devices. Such micro-mixers which are used for biochemical, medicine, biology applications has no mechanical parts and only use conducting surfaces to generate induced vortices to mix the different fluid streams,

This phenomenon even is used to trap the micron and submicron particles floating in flow inside a micro-channel. This method can be used to manipulate, detect, handle, and concentrate cells and virus in biomedical field; or, for colloidal particle assembly.

In addition the induced vortices around the conducting surfaces in a microfluidic system can be used as a micro-valve, micro-actuator, micro-motor and micro-regulator to control the direction and  manipulation.

See also
 Surface charge
 Electro-osmosis
 Electrophoresis
 Diffusiophoresis
 Lab-on-a-chip

References

Microfluidics
Fluid dynamics
Biotechnology
Electrochemistry